Mark Matlak (born May 9, 1956) is a former American football and baseball coach. He served as the head football coach at Allegheny College from 2002 to 2015, compiling a record of 62–79. Matlak was also the head baseball coach at Allegheny  from 1979 to 1982, tallying a mark of 36–50.  Matlak was also the head baseball coach at Allegheny from 1979 to 1982, tallying a mark of 36–50.

References

External links
 Allegheny profile

1956 births
Living people
American football fullbacks
Allegheny Gators baseball coaches
Allegheny Gators baseball players
Allegheny Gators football coaches
Allegheny Gators football players
New Hampshire Wildcats football coaches